Jean-Paul Christophe Manoux (born June 8, 1969) is an American actor, director and writer. He is perhaps best known for his work on multiple Disney television series. He played S.T.A.N. the android in Aaron Stone, both Curtis the Caveman and Vice Principal Hackett in Phil of the Future, and voiced Kuzco in The Emperor's New School. Before fame, Manoux was a contestant on Jeopardy!, Family Feud, and Wheel of Fortune.

Early life
Manoux was born in Fresno, California on June 8, 1969. He grew up in Santa Barbara, California, the eldest of seven children. He attended Thacher School in Ojai, California and Northwestern University in Evanston, Illinois. Upon graduating and moving to Hollywood, Manoux studied Improv and sketch comedy at L.A. Theatresports, ACME Comedy Theatre, The Groundlings School, and iO West.

Career
One of Manoux's early roles was as a regular performer on The Wayne Brady Show. He went on from there to work extensively in television and commercials, including campaigns for Got Milk? and Fruit of the Loom. Manoux portrayed Dr. Dustin Crenshaw in two of the later seasons of ER. Other memorable guest star roles in television series include How I Met Your Mother, Angel, Smallville, Charmed, Scrubs, and Community. He has also appeared in episodes of Grey's Anatomy, Shameless, Will & Grace and recurred on the HBO series Veep and the PopTV series Swedish Dicks.

Manoux has portrayed a character impersonating musician Moby on several occasions; in the How I Met Your Mother episode "The Limo", and for a four-episode run on Community. He has also played a mime on more than one occasion, briefly on ER (1996), years before he became a recurring character there, and in EuroTrip (2004).

He has also made small appearances in two Michael Bay films: Transformers, where he was a man being interviewed on television, and in The Island, where he portrayed a mentally underdeveloped clone.

Manoux has also provided voice work in several films and animated television shows, including Scrappy Rex and Brainiac Scooby in Scooby-Doo and Scooby-Doo 2: Monsters Unleashed and most notably as the voice of Kuzco in various Disney projects, including  House of Mouse, Mickey's Magical Christmas: Snowed in at the House of Mouse, The Emperor's New School and The Emperor's New Groove: The Video Game.

Manoux has directed episodes of Aaron Stone, Phil of the Future, Mudpit and Spun Out. He has also written for The Wayne Brady Show, The X-Fools video game, Microshaft Winblows 98 and wrote the 1997 short film Tights on a Wire along with George Brant.

He has authored and read two pieces for NPR's All Things Considered. Back in 2000, he provided commentary on the Screen Actors Guild strike as a striking actor and he refused to do any scab work.

Legal dispute
In 2015, Manoux appeared in Canadian court after two people staying in his Toronto condo discovered a home security camera and told police officers about it. On July 30, 2015, the specific charge of voyeurism against him was dropped.

Filmography

Film

Dubbing

Television

Video games

Web series

Writer

References

External links

 
 

1969 births
Living people
20th-century American male actors
21st-century American male actors
American male film actors
American male television actors
American male video game actors
American male voice actors
American people of French descent
American television directors
Jeopardy! contestants
Male actors from Fresno, California
Male actors from Santa Barbara, California